El colectivo or colectivo, Spanish for "collective", may refer to:

Buses 
 Colectivo the name for a bus in Argentina, Chile, Paraguay and Uruguay
 Colectivo 60, a bus route in Buenos Aires, Argentina 
 Colectivo 64, a bus route in Buenos Aires, Argentina

Organizations 
 Colectivo (Venezuela), community organization in Venezuela
 Colectivos de Jóvenes Comunistas, Spanish youth organization affiliated to the Communist Party of the Peoples of Spain (PCPE).
 Colectivo Comunista 22 de marzo, a separatist political party in Galicia, Spain.
 Colectivo Socialista was a Galician political organization that was part of the Galician Nationalist Bloc (BNG)

Companies 
 Colectivo Coffee Roasters, until 2013 the company was known as Alterra Coffee Roasters

See also 

 Collective (disambiguation)